Organdy, also spelled Organdie, is a kind of sheer fabric. It is a lightweight balanced plain weave cotton with features of sheerness and crispness.

Characteristics 
Organdy is a stiffened material; sheerest among its peers, such as lawn cloth and Batiste. Often, these materials may come from the same grey goods, and are differentiated from each other in how they are finished. Organdy's sheerness and crispness are attributed to the acid finish (parchmentising) whereas the lawn is finished with starch or resin, and Batiste is a softer fabric type. Finer yarns with higher twist counts are used in superior quality organdy.

Process
Organdy is an acid stiffened cloth. Its sheerness and crispness is the result of an acid finish, where the fabric is treated with sulfuric acid solution for a short period and then neutralized to remove excessive acid. The process is named "parchmentising". The parchmentisation is a treatment of acid on cellulosic textiles in the pursuit of obtaining the characteristic of the parchment.The finish offers a stiffened and translucent effect, not dissimilar from silk organza. Figured Organdy is produced by applying an acid-resisting substance to a localised area; on the contrary, immersing it completely makes it stiffen all over. The objective of all-over parchmentizing is to create a transparent cloth.

Use 
Organdy was used for bridal dresses, ladies party dresses, and blouses. Organdy was a useful material as a Casement cloth, sheers, and lining etc. In the late 19th through mid 20th century, young girls used to wear dresses made of organdy. Because the material has a wrinkling tendency due to stiffened properties, it has fallen out of favor in the childrenswear market. Today, organdy is most often seen in high fashion collections by designers such as Marc Jacobs.

See also
 Organza

References

Sources
 

Woven fabrics